The N platform series, currently consists of the N3 platform, is a platform developed by Hyundai and Kia for its range of front-wheel drive-based mid-size (D-segment) automobiles since 2019.

N3 platform 
The N3 platform was introduced in 2019 with the eighth generation Hyundai Sonata, dubbed as the 'third-generation platform'.

Vehicles using platform (calendar years):

 Hyundai Santa Cruz (NX4a OB) (2021–present)
 Hyundai Santa Fe (TM PE) (facelift, 2020–present)
 Hyundai Sonata (DN8) (2019–present)
 Hyundai Staria (US4) (2021–present)
 Hyundai Tucson (NX4) (2020–present)
 Kia Carnival (KA4) (2020–present)
 Kia K5 (DL3) (2019–present)
 Kia K8 (GL3) (2021–present)
 Kia Sorento (MQ4) (2020–present)
 Kia Sportage (NQ5) (2021–present)

References 

N platforms